Mimauxa is a genus of longhorn beetles of the subfamily Lamiinae, containing the following species:

 Mimauxa densepunctatus Breuning, 1957
 Mimauxa ochreoapicalis Breuning, 1970
 Mimauxa puncticollis Breuning, 1980
 Mimauxa rufoantennata Breuning, 1980

References

Desmiphorini